André Soltner  (born 1932 in Alsace, France) is an internationally recognized French chef and author working in the United States. He is arguably one of America's first superstar chefs.

Background 
Soltner started his career at the age of 15 at the Hôtel du Parc, Mulhouse, in his native Alsace and later became chef-owner of New York City's French restaurant Lutèce, which achieved a four-star rating from The New York Times.
Soltner missed only five days of work in 34 years at Lutèce.

Achievements 
André has received more than 25 awards, including the French government's prestigious Légion d'honneur and Officier du Mérite National.  Highlights of his other recognitions include the James Beard Foundation Lifetime Achievement Award, Meilleur Ouvrier de France, and the Chevalier du Mérite Agricole

Soltner is a member of several culinary organizations, including the American Institute of Wine & Food, for which he and his wife Simone established the André and Simone Soltner Food Education Scholarship to assist applicants seeking a culinary career.  Soltner is a member of the American Culinary Federation, the Chef de Cuisine Association of America and the Société de Cuisiniers de France.  He previously served for more than 20 years as Délegué Général of the Maîtres Cuisiniers de France (Master Chefs of France) and is a trustee of the Société Culinaire Philanthropique. He co-authored The Lutèce Cookbook.

On 13 May 2010, Soltner, along with other chefs from the French Culinary Institute (now known as The International Culinary Center) (Jacques Pepin, Jacques Torres and Alain Sailhac), prepared a $30,000-per-couple dinner for U.S. President Barack Obama's fund-raiser for the Democratic Congressional Campaign Committee at Manhattan's St. Regis hotel.

Soltner today 
Soltner serves as Dean of Classic Studies at the French Culinary Institute, part of the new International Culinary Center in New York City.

References

External links
New York Times
Lutece Cookbook
The International Culinary Center

French chefs
French food writers
Living people
1932 births
French male non-fiction writers
James Beard Foundation Award winners
French restaurateurs